Non-periodic comets are seen only once.  They are usually on near-parabolic orbits that will not return to the vicinity of the Sun for thousands of years, if ever.

Periodic comets usually have elongated elliptical orbits, and usually return to the vicinity of the Sun after a number of decades.

The official names of non-periodic comets begin with a "C"; the names of periodic comets begin with "P" or a number followed by "P".  Comets that have been lost or disappeared have names with a "D". Comets whose orbit has not been determined are designated with a "X" prefix.

Lists 
 List of comets by type
 List of comets visited by spacecraft
 List of comets with no meaningful orbit
 List of Great Comets
 List of Halley-type comets
 List of hyperbolic comets
 List of long-period comets
 List of near-parabolic comets
 List of numbered comets
 List of periodic comets

See also
 Lists of astronomical objects
 Comet vintages

External links 
 Bright Comet Chronicles
 1994 Resolution about comet names
 Comets currently above mag. 12 - Heavens-Above

Lists of small Solar System bodies